Maurice James "Moe" Murphy Jr. (October 3, 1927 – October 27, 2002) was an American politician and lawyer from New Hampshire. He was (for one  month) the New Hampshire Attorney General and (for eleven months) an appointed United States Senator.

Early life, education & military service
He was born in Dover, New Hampshire and graduated from Dover High School and St. Mary's Academy. He graduated from the College of the Holy Cross in 1950 and from Boston College Law School in 1953. He was admitted to the bar and commenced the practice of law in Portsmouth in 1955.  He served as an enlisted man in the United States Army in 1946 and 1947 and again in 1953 and 1954.

Legal & political career
He was legal counsel to the New Hampshire Senate in 1957–1958, and administrative assistant to Governor Wesley Powell from 1959 to 1961.  After serving as deputy attorney general for several months, Murphy was appointed by Governor Powell as New Hampshire Attorney General, and took office on November 4, 1961. Three weeks later, the longest-serving U.S. Senator, conservative Republican H. Styles Bridges, died in office. On December 7, 1961, Governor Powell appointed Murphy as U.S. Senator, to fill the vacancy until a November 1962 special election. Powell's choice of Murphy was controversial; powerful publisher William Loeb published a front-page editorial in the Manchester Union Leader attacking Powell for passing over the late Senator's widow Doloris Bridges. Many political observers expected that Mrs. Bridges would be appointed to her husband's seat. Murphy voted in favor of the 24th Amendment to the U.S. Constitution.

Murphy ran in the 1962 election in an effort to keep his seat.  However, Murphy was challenged in the primary by Doloris Bridges, Congressman Perkins Bass, and Congressman Chester Merrow. Murphy finished third behind Bass and Mrs. Bridges.  Governor Powell, too, was defeated in that primary, and in his election night speech, he referenced Loeb's opposition and added that "I'm paying the penalty for appointing a Catholic to the U.S. Senate."

He later served on the Portsmouth Economic Commission, Portsmouth Housing Authority and was elected chairman of the board of the Portsmouth-Kittery Armed Services Committee (now called the Seacoast Shipyard Association). He served on the New Hampshire Boundary Commission from 1973 to 1975.

Later life and death
Murphy then resumed the practice of law.  He was chairman of the board and general counsel of the Portsmouth (N.H.) Savings Bank from 1968 to 1988. At the time of his death in 2002, he resided in Stratham, New Hampshire. He was interred in Prospect Hill Cemetery in Greenland, New Hampshire.

Personal life
He was married to Mary E. Doody. They had three children. His wife died in 2016.

References 
Citations

Sources

External links 

1927 births
2002 deaths
People from Dover, New Hampshire
College of the Holy Cross alumni
Boston College Law School alumni
United States Army soldiers
New Hampshire Attorneys General
New Hampshire Republicans
Republican Party United States senators from New Hampshire
People from Stratham, New Hampshire
20th-century American politicians
20th-century American lawyers
21st-century American lawyers
Dover High School (New Hampshire) alumni